is a 1978 Japanese film in Nikkatsu's Roman porno series, directed by Kōyū Ohara and starring Kaori Takeda, Ako and Yūko Katagiri. It is based on an award-winning novel by Osamu Hashimoto.

Synopsis
An extroverted high school girl befriends an introverted female classmate, and the two begin exploring their curiosity about sex together. They begin working as prostitutes, but their friendship is tested when they both fall in love with the same man. The film ends on an upbeat note with the two girls reconciling their friendship.

Cast
 Kahori Takeda as Rena Sakakibara
 Ako as Yuko Taguchi
 Atsushi Takahashi as Gen'ichi Kikawada
 Yūji Nogami as Takinoue
 Akio Kuwasaki as Yamashina
 Asami Morikawa as Ryōko Matsuzaki
 Kunio Shimizu as Tōru Kinoshita
 Risato Sasaki	
 Yūko Katagiri as Tokie Yamada
 Yûya Uchida as Sen'ichi Yamada
 Ushi Tōyama as Ken Ishida
 Satoko Ōtake as High school girl
 Nobue Ichitani as Nobue Sakakibara
 Etsuko Seki as Hiroko Taguchi
 Shirô Kishibe as Mastumoto
 Osamu Hashimoto as Shop owner

Critical appraisal
In their Japanese Cinema Encyclopedia: The Sex Films, the Weissers note that with the Pink Tush Girl trilogy, Kōyū Ohara reversed the style of his earlier dark films such as the True Story of a Woman in Prison trilogy (1975-1977). In the Pink Tush Girl films Ohara depicts, "an erotic world from pop music and high school tribulations". Unlike most films in the Roman Porno series, the films were popular with both men and women. The Weissers attribute this partly to the on-screen relationship between the two lead performers, Kahori Takeda and Ako.

The director noted that this upbeat, breezy take on the sex lives of two female characters was at odds with the way that women were depicted in the pink film at the time. Ohara was enthusiastic about this aspect of the project, and because of this, caused the film to go over-budget. He remembered, "I was scolded severely by the Nikkatsu management", but he felt vindicated when the film's popularity caused the studio to ask him to make sequels.

In his survey of the films of Kōyū Ohara, Graham Lewis writes that though Pink Hip Girl is less serious in tone than Ohara's earlier films, it is no less well-made and thoroughly enjoyable. He notes that Ohara's nickname, "King of Pink-Pop" derives largely from his work in this film and its sequels. Lewis concludes: "If Ohara's other films sound too rough for you, this might be your cup of tea".

Jasper Sharp judges Pink Tush Girl to be arguably Ohara's best film. He writes that the film's road movie structure, catchy theme song, and longer running length make it a more fully rounded cinematic experience than many contemporary Nikkatsu Roman Pornos. He speculates that, because of the wider popularity of this film, Nikkatsu would have been wise to pursue the lighter tone of this film rather than the dark S&M films that they concentrated on producing at the time.

Availability
Pink Tush Girl was released theatrically in Japan on April 29, 1978. It was released on DVD in Japan on DVD December 22, 2005, as part of Geneon's second wave of Nikkatsu Roman porno series.

References
Notes

Bibliography
English
  
 
 
 

Japanese
 
 
 
 
 

1978 films
Films directed by Kōyū Ohara
1970s Japanese-language films
Japanese sex comedy films
Nikkatsu films
Nikkatsu Roman Porno
Films about prostitution in Japan
1970s sex comedy films
1970s Japanese films